Lieutenant General Mohammed Ali Al-Maqdashi (born 1962) is a Yemeni military officer. On 28 July 2022 he appointed by Rashad Al-Alaimi as an advisor to the Yemen's Presidential Leadership Council for military and security affairs. He was previously Yemeni Minister of Defense, and a military advisor to former President Abdrabbuh Mansur Hadi. He also served as chief of staff of the Yemeni Armed Forces.

On 19 February 2020, a landmine explosion struck the motorcade of the Hadi Government Ministry of Defense in Marib leaving six bodyguards dead. Ali Al-Maqdashi survived the attack.

References

Living people
Defence ministers of Yemen
Yemeni politicians
Yemeni generals
1962 births
People from Dhamar Governorate
Yemeni military personnel of the Yemeni Civil War (2014–present)
Ministry of Defense (Yemen)
Chiefs of the General Staff (Yemen)
Yemeni Military Academy alumni
First Maeen Cabinet